The 2022 Super League Grand Final was the 25th official grand final and championship-deciding rugby league game of Super League XXVII. The match was contested between St Helens and the Leeds Rhinos, for a record fifth time at Old Trafford.

Background

Route to the final

St Helens

St Helens ended the regular season as League leaders, thus earning them a bye to the semi final.

They played the lowest ranked winner of the eliminators, which was Salford.

2 minutes into the match, Salford lost Andy Ackers to a head injury, to which he then failed a HIA, ruling him out for the rest of the game.

The first try of the game came on 14 minutes, with Joe Batchelor touching down to give saints a 4–0 lead. Tommy Makinson converting the try 6–0.
Batchelor got his 2nd try of the game 5 minutes later, with Makinson again converting the try to make it 12–0.
Saints' Morgan Knowles was then penalised on 24 minutes, for an alleged Chicken wing tackle, to which he was sent to the sin bin for.
From the resulting penalty, Kallum Watkins got Salford's first try of the game. Marc Sneyd converted the try 12–6.
With less than a minute of the first half remaining, Jonny Lomax kicked a drop goal, to give saints a 13–6 lead at half time.
Matty Lees thought he'd scored saints 3rd try on 49 minutes, but it was ruled out for a double movement.

Salford scored again on 61 minutes, as Joe Burgess broke clear down the left, to send Ryan Brierley under the posts, to bring Salford to within 1 point.

Saints scored again on 70 minutes, through Jon Bennison, to give saints a 5 point lead, before Makinson again converted to make it 19–12.

With 5 minutes of the game remaining, Salford were denied a possible penalty try, as Tommy Makinson committed a professional foul, as he pulled back Tim Lafai off the ball, as he was chasing a grubber kick. Makinson was sent to the sin, and the referee did not award a penalty try, as he deemed lafai would not have gotten to the ball in time.

Leeds Rhinos

Leeds finished the regular season in 5th, by beating Castleford Tigers 14–8 on the final day of the season, thus earning them a place in the eliminators.

First Eliminator

Leeds traveled to Catalans Dragons, in a game which saw 4 cards shown (3 yellow, 1 red). Mitchell Pearce was sent to the bin twice, and Michael McIllorum was also binned for the dragons, with Gil Dudson later sent off, for headbutting Aiden Sezer.

Catalans got the first points of the game on 28 minutes, as Leeds were penalised for offside. Sam Tomkins opted to kick the penalty goal, to which he was successful. Catalans 2-0 Leeds.

Leeds were penalised again for offside on 32 minutes, and Tomkins successfully kicked the penalty, to give the dragons a 4–0 lead. 

Leeds got the first try of the game through Liam Sutcliffe, to level the scores at 4-4.
Zak Hardaker kicked the conversion, to give Leeds a 6–4 lead.

With 3 minutes of the first half remaining, Sutcliffe scored his, and Leeds' 2nd try, to which was awarded by the video referee.
Hardaker once again on target with the conversion, to give Leeds a 12-4 lead going into half time.

3 minutes into the 2nd half, Catalans got their first (and only) try of the game, through Dean Whare, with Tomkins successful with the conversion, to get Catalans to within 2 points.

On 64 minutes, Sutcliffe got his 3rd try of the game, again being awarded by the video referee.
Hardaker once again successful with the conversion, to give Leeds an 8 point lead.

With less than 1 minute remaining, Leeds were awarded a penalty,  with hardaker once again successful. 

Final score: Catalans 10-20 Leeds

Semi-final

Leeds travelled to Wigan in the semi final, as the highest ranked winner of the eliminators.

The first try of the game, came on 8 minutes, through Liam Marshall, after he made an acrobatic dive for the corner. The video referee awarded the try, as Marshall did not put a foot in touch before grounding the ball. Harry Smith missed the conversion.

On 19 minutes, Leeds were awarded a scrum, after a knock on from Wigan, but the referee gave a penalty to Wigan, due to interference at the scrum. Smith opted to go for goal, but the kick was wide, and the score remained 4-0.

With 5 minutes of the first half remaining, Leeds were awarded a penalty 10 metres out, to which Zak Hardaker kicked the goal, and bring Leeds back to within 2 points heading into half time.

5 minutes into the 2nd half, Leeds got their first try of the game, through Jarrod O'Connor, with Hardaker successful with the conversion, to give Leeds an 8-4 lead.

3 minutes later, Leeds scored again, with a try from James Bentley. Hardaker successful again with the conversion, to make it 14-4 to Leeds.

Things got worse for Wigan on 51 minutes, as John Bateman was shown a red card, for a late/dangerous tackle on Aiden Sezer, to which he was then required to leave the field for a HIA, before failing to pass the test, which meant he couldn't return.

With 15 minutes of the game remaining, Bentley scored his 2nd try of the game, to send Leeds to their first grand final since 2017, and ended Wigan's 13 match unbeaten home record.

Sam Powell scored a late consolation try for Wigan, but it was too little too late for Wigan.

Match details

Notes

References

External links
Rugby League Project - Super League XXVII 2022 - St Helens
Rugby League Project - Super League XXVII 2022 - Leeds Rhinos

Super League Grand Finals
Rugby league in England
Super League Grand Final
Grand Final
St Helens R.F.C. matches
Leeds Rhinos matches